"51st state" is a phrase that refers to areas considered candidates for addition to the 50 states already part of the United States.

51st State may also refer to:

 "51st State" (song), a 1986 song by New Model Army 
 The 51st State, a 2001 British film 
 51st State, a 1998 novel by Peter Preston
 51st State, a 2010 board game

See also
 Area 51, a highly classified United States Air Force facility located within the Nevada Test and Training Range